Piret Viirma (born 27 March 1968 Paide) is an Estonian draughts player who was her nation's champion in women's draughts in 1998. She is currently the highest rated women's player in Estonia.

References 

Players of international draughts
Estonian draughts players
Sportspeople from Paide
1968 births
Living people